Church of Saint Peter in Cremeno is a Roman Catholic church in Genoa, the capital of  Liguria, Italy within the Archdiocese of Genoa.

Notes

Roman Catholic churches completed in 1807
Pietro di Cremeno
Baroque architecture in Liguria
Neoclassical architecture in Liguria
19th-century Roman Catholic church buildings in Italy
Neoclassical church buildings in Italy